Güllütəpə (also, Qüllütəpə, Güllütäpä, Gyullyutepe, and Gyulu-Tapa) is a village and municipality in the Masally Rayon of Azerbaijan.  It has a population of 2,383.  The municipality consists of the villages of Güllütəpə and Əmirtürbə.

References 

Populated places in Masally District